Saad Hussain Rizvi is the second leader of Tehreek-e-Labbaik Pakistan, a far-right Pakistani Islamist political party. He draws influence from Imam Ahmed Raza Khan. He is the son of the TLP's founder Khadim Hussain Rizvi.

Early life
Saad Rizvi was born into a Punjabi  Awan family from Pindi Gheb, Attock District, Punjab, Pakistan. He moved to Lahore Masjid Rehmatal-lil-Almeen (Yateem Khanna Chowk, Lahore) where his father was a mosque preacher. He attended the Royal Grammar School and later joined his father's Madrassah Abbu Zar Ghaffari for Hifz-E-Quran. Later, he studied Qirat-o-Tajweed for a year. He is fluent in Arabic, Persian, Urdu and Punjabi languages.
After matriculation, he attended various madarsas in Pakistan for his Islamic education. He studied Dars e Nezami for eight years which is equivalent to Masters in Arabic and Islamic Studies. Like his father, he is known for heavily quoting Allama Iqbal and Ahmad Raza Khan. He is deeply interested in works of Mevlana Rumi, Hafiz Shirazi,Muhammad Alyan Nazir Rizvi,Amir Khusroo and Akbar Allahabadi.

Political career 
Rizvi joined Tehreek-e-Labbaik Pakistan in 2015. He served as the Deputy Secretary-General of the party. In November 2020, after the death of his father Khadim Hussain Rizvi, Saad Rizvi became the leader of Tehreek-e-Labbaik Pakistan.

2021 protests

On 12 April 2021, the Government of Pakistan arrested Rizvi in Lahore and charged under Pakistan's Anti-Terrorism Act, 1997 (ATA), which caused unrest.

Attiq Ahmed, the public relations officer of Punjab Prisons said on 20 April that Rizvi had been released. Lahore's Jail Superintendent Asad Warraich, however, said he did not know of any such release and they had received no order to release him. Interior Minister Sheikh Rasheed Ahmad later confirmed that Rizvi had not been freed.

A review board of the Lahore High Court rejected extending Saad's detention on 8 July, stating the government had no evidence to keep him in custody. His detention was however later extended by the government for 90 days under the Anti-Terrorism Act 1997. The Lahore High Court ruled his detention illegal on 1 October, in response to a petition filed by his uncle. The federal review board of the Supreme Court however extended his detention by a month on the next day.

The Government of Punjab later appealed to the Supreme Court against the Lahore High Court's decision, but it handed over the case on 12 October to a two-member special bench of the Lahore High Court to decide. The TLP later again took to protests to demand his release. After a deal reached between the Government of Pakistan and the TLP, the ban on the organisation was removed and Rizvi's name was removed from the terrorism watchlist on 12 November. He was released from prison on 18 November.

References

Living people
Tehreek-e-Labbaik Pakistan politicians
Pakistani Sunni Muslims
Pakistani Muslim activists
21st-century Muslims
Pakistani Islamists
Year of birth missing (living people)